The following is a list of notable hotels in Nigeria.

Hotels in Nigeria

Unsorted
 Bogobiri House
 Dolphin Estate – a gated community in Ikoyi, Lagos that also hosts several hotels like Oakwood Park Hotel, Casa Hawa-Safe Court, Le Paris Continental Hotel and Pelican

See also
 Lists of hotels – hotel list articles on Wikipedia

References

External links

 

 *
Nigeria